Dunlea Centre, prior to 2010 known as Boys' Town Engadine, is an Australian residential secondary school for adolescent young people and their families; the centre is focused on working with young people where there are identified behavioural issues. Boys' Town Engadine – Dunlea Centre helps children, young people and their families to overcome the most severe disadvantages – problems such as abuse, homelessness, long term unemployment, mental health issues and the challenges of disability. The school is located in the Sydney suburb of Engadine, New South Wales and is run by the Roman Catholic Salesians, a religious order of priests, in conjunction with specialist teachers and social workers.

Boys' Town Engadine – Dunlea Centre provides a voluntary service for families at risk of family breakdown, who are committed to improving their relationships. Boys' Town Engadine – Dunlea Centre provides intensive life skills, therapeutic and educational services in an out of home care setting.

History 
In 1934,  Thomas Dunlea, a parish priest of Sutherland, was requested by a dying woman to look after her son, Eric Green. After the woman's death, Dunlea took the boy to the parish presbytery. Over the ensuing years, a number of young boys were entrusted to his care during the Great Depression.

On 1 August 1939, Dunlea formally opened the school with seven boys in his care. The purpose of the school was to help disadvantaged young males. His inspiration was the Boys' Town of the 1938 movie which was based on the original Boystown in Nebraska, United States, founded by Edward J. Flanagan. Dunlea described the school as:
"Boys’ Town is for homeless and friendless boys — it is the hometown; the fair-dinkum town; the town of charity, unity and kindness; it is a smooth landing ground."

The boys were moved to a bigger house at the corner of Glencoe and Flora Streets, Sutherland but Sutherland Shire Council forced them out over a minor nuisance notice. On 17 July 1940, Father Dunlea led 21 boys in procession through Sutherland carrying banners and chanting. The boys pitched tents in the Royal National Park near Loftus and there they lived for 9 weeks.

Publicity led to hundreds of people coming to visit the boys camped in the bush at ‘Canvastown.’ Telegrams and cablegrams of compassion and support poured in. Representatives from government institutions and various churches sent notes of sympathy and encouragement and newspapers across Australia informed readers of the boys’ plight. More importantly, financial assistance was forthcoming. £14,000 was donated by the Australian Meat Industry Association, £12,000 was raised to build poultry facilities. Amongst those who made donations was bookmaker George Nathan who organised the Sunday Carnivals with car races at the Sydney Showgrounds and raised £100,000 to erect a new Boys’ Town. On 4 May 1941, then Premier of New South Wales, Mr Alexander Mair, laid the foundation stone of a new building at Engadine.

Boys' Town was to be partly self-supporting and to be run by the boys themselves with the priest's oversight. Boys' Town came to have school rooms and a chapel but also a small farm with livestock, stables, water supply, vegetable gardens and orchard groves maintained and worked by the boys. The boys operated a butchery, leather works, metalwork blacksmiths and foundry, carpentry and woodworks, small brickworks, bakery and shops as well as the dormitory, kitchen dining room and laundry and, later, a hospital and swimming pool. As a "town" the boys constituted their own council and conducted their own elections for the positions of mayor, aldermen, health inspectors and other officers. In 1942, at Archbishop Cardinal Sir Norman Gilroy's request, the De La Salle Brothers came to Boys' Town.  In 1944, Boys' Town received a grant of 40 acres in nearby East Heathcote in Wilson Parade on which it was hoped to develop a farm. By 1945, Boys' Town had 110 boys – mostly orphans aged between 8 and 18 years. The Heathcote farm was not a success and was sold. Dunlea resigned his parish, roamed and moved to the United States in 1947, returning to Australia later in the 1940s. Boys' Town's soon included many troubled and "at risk" boys, referred by courts, police, social service and education authorities as well as orphans, abandoned and other disadvantaged boys. As a residential community, Boys' Town effected banishment, disassociation from former influences and substitution of parents and provided boys with alternatives and training. Boys' Town boys participated in organised sports and fielded teams in local competitions, notably Australian rules football, in an era when the sport was rare in much of New South Wales. Some of its grounds became playing fields.

Boys' Town lost its funding from the Sydney Carnival when the New South Wales Rugby League wanted the show grounds for games. From the 1960s, as suburbia rapidly encroached and the nearby Engadine retail centre grew, Boys' Town increasingly ceased to be a self-supporting community and became just a residential school for disadvantaged boys. In 1978, there was a total of 135 students at Boys' Town (mostly 'boarders' with a small percentage of 'day' students). By 1989 the number of boys at Boys' Town had dropped to 40 with each boy having his own room. Many of the older Boys' Town buildings had not complied with newer fire and other regulations and government funding conditions and required major renovations completed in 1992.

In 2010 the trading name of Boys' Town Engadine was changed to Dunlea Centre as the agency ran residential programs for adolescent girls as well as boys.

Notable alumni and former staff

Alumni 
Ben Lexcen – designer of Australia's victorious (1983) America's Cup yacht.
John Travers - one of the Anita Cobby killers, sentenced to life imprisonment.
Ivan Milat – serial killer responsible for the Backpacker Murders
Robert Parsons - author Madigan Perry's Luck part of lead up to Royal Commission into institutional child abuse. Boys' Town is in the story.

Former staff 
Chris Riley, AM – founder of Youth Off the Streets
Dennis Halliday – awarded a PhD posthumously by the Australian Catholic University for his thesis The strategic use of the wellness model in adolescent residential centres : implications for partnership between parents and the centres in relation to his work with Boys' Town.

References

External links
 dunleacentre.org.au
 St John Bosco College link to Boys Town, part of the Bosco Community

Further reading

Private secondary schools in Sydney
1939 establishments in Australia